The open-loop gain of an electronic amplifier is the gain obtained when no overall feedback is used in the circuit.

The open-loop gain of many electronic amplifiers is exceedingly high (by design) – an ideal operational amplifier (op-amp) has infinite open-loop gain.

Normally, negative feedback is applied around an amplifier with high open-loop gain, to reduce the gain of the complete circuit to a desired value.

Definition
The definition of open-loop gain (at a fixed frequency) is

where  is the input voltage difference that is being amplified. (The dependence on frequency is not displayed here.)

Role in non-ideal gain
The open-loop gain is a physical attribute of an operational amplifier that is often finite in comparison to the ideal gain. While open-loop gain is the gain when there is no feedback in a circuit, an operational amplifier will often be configured to use a feedback configuration such that its gain will be controlled by the feedback circuit components.

Take the case of an inverting operational amplifier configuration.

However, including the finite open-loop gain  reduces the gain slightly, to:

(The second equation becomes effectively the same as the first equation as  approaches infinity.)

The open-loop gain can be important for computing the actual gain of an operational amplifier network, where the assumption of infinite open-loop gain is inaccurate.

Operational amplifiers
The open-loop gain of an operational amplifier falls very rapidly with increasing frequency. Along with slew rate, this is one of the reasons why operational amplifiers have limited bandwidth.

See also
Gain–bandwidth product
Loop gain (includes both the open-loop gain and the feedback attenuation)
Summary of negative feedback amplifier terms

Electrical parameters
Open-loop gain. (2020, December 15). In Wikipedia. https://en.wikipedia.org/wiki/Open-loop_gain